"Til Tomorrow" is a 1982 R&B/soul quiet storm-styled song recorded by American singer Marvin Gaye. The song was the second US single off Midnight Love released in February 1983. The release also served as a promotional song as Gaye prepped for a U.S. tour in the year of its release.

Background
Released on his Midnight Love album, it was the sole ballad in the album, which focused mainly on funk rhythms and dance material. Gaye was the sole lyricist of the song. When asked how the lyrics of the song seemed more primitive than Gaye's previous ballads, the singer said he had run out of ideas on lyrics. The song is described as a bare-bones song with "heavenly scat riffs". Gaye provides accentuated doo-wop harmonies in the background while delivering both a jazzy-inspired baritone and a gospel-inflected tenor with falsetto stuck in the middle of it. The original demo of the song (titled "Baby, Baby, Baby") showcased the frustration Gaye was going through during the recording of Midnight Love. The spoken intro by Gaye was later modified by the singer while mention of the word "shit" was also taken off of the final track as was extra lyrics added during the saxophone solo provided by Bobby Stern. The song was later covered by Chico DeBarge.

Reception
Billboard called it "an intricate composition with some startling chords in the instrumental arrangements and harmonies."

Chart performance
The song was issued as a single mainly for R&B radio while Gaye was prepping for his upcoming "Sexual Healing" tour, which took place in April 1983. Due to strong initial airplay, the song peaked at number thirty-one on the R&B singles chart.

Credits
All vocals by Marvin Gaye
Instrumentation by the following:
Marvin Gaye: synthesizers
Gordon Banks: guitar, bass, drums
Bobby Stern: tenor saxophone solo
Produced by Marvin Gaye

References

1983 singles
Marvin Gaye songs
Songs written by Marvin Gaye
Song recordings produced by Marvin Gaye
1982 songs
Columbia Records singles
Quiet storm songs
Rhythm and blues ballads
Soul ballads